David W. Peterson (July 17, 1959 – May 25, 1993), better known by his ring name D. J. Peterson was an American professional wrestler.

He is best known for competing in various North American regional promotions during the 1980s, including the Universal Wrestling Federation, the National Wrestling Alliance, and most notably the American Wrestling Association during its final days. While there, he and The Trooper became the final holders of the AWA Tag Team Championship.

Professional wrestling career

Early career
Making his debut in 1984, Peterson started wrestling in Texas All-Star Wrestling and in the NWA Central States. During the mid-1980s, Peterson briefly appeared in Fritz von Erich's World Class Championship Wrestling defeating Jack Victory on February 7 and Prairie States Wrestling against Ox Baker on July 23 before wrestling in the Mid-South area and, by early 1986, for Bill Watts' Universal Wrestling Federation facing wrestlers such as Gustavo Mendoza and, in tag team matches, teamed with Brett Sawyer against Mike Scott and Rick Steiner, the Blade Runners and the Fabulous Freebirds (Terry "Bam Bam" Gordy & Buddy Roberts) in their UWF debut. He also wrestled Bart Sawyer several times, losing to him on May 3 and teamed with Chavo Guerrero against Sawyer and Rick Steiner in the following weeks.

Later that year, he teamed with Todd Champion feuding with the Thunderfoots and faced Big Bubba Rogers and The Warlord and The MOD Squad during October while in Jim Crockett Promotions as well as wrestling Arn Anderson in St. Louis, Missouri on November 16, 1986.

American Wrestling Association- First Stint
Jumping to the American Wrestling Association in 1987, Peterson fought Super Ninja to a time limit draw at SuperClash II on May 2, 1987. He would also form a team with J. T. Southern, attempting to gain the AWA World Tag Team titles, but ended up coming short.

Other Federations
He then split his time wrestling in several territories during the next two years appearing on the debut television show of Continental Championship Wrestling and had a brief stint in the World Wrestling Federation, primarily being used as a jobber. In 1989, he would head up to Calgary for Stampede Wrestling until its closure on December 18.

American Wrestling Association- Second Stint
Peterson returned to the AWA full-time in early 1990 teaming with Brad Rheingans against the Texas Hangmen at SuperClash IV on April 8, 1990 and later to pursue then AWA World Champion Mr. Saito. When Larry Zbyszko regained the title, Peterson was granted title shots although he failed to unseat the World Champion. Shortly thereafter, he formed a tag team with The Trooper which captured the AWA World Tag Team Titles from The Destruction Crew on August 11, 1990. Defending the titles during the rest of the year, Peterson and Trooper would turn out to be the last AWA World Tag Team Champions. In January 1991, Pro Wrestling Illustrated and its sister publications withdrew recognition of the AWA's World Championship status but continued to recognize Trooper and Peterson as incumbent "AWA Tag Team Champions" until the promotion finally closed later that year.

Later career
After the AWA closed in early 1991, Peterson went back to the independents until he died from a motorcycle crash on May 25, 1993.

Championships and accomplishments
American Wrestling Association
AWA World Tag Team Championship (1 time) - with The Trooper
Central States Wrestling
NWA Central States Heavyweight Championship (2 times) 
NWA Central States Tag Team Championship (1 time) - with Todd Champion
Texas All-Star Wrestling
TASW Six-Man Tag Team Championship (1 time) - with Paul Diamond & Shawn Michaels
World Class Championship Wrestling
WCCW Television Championship (1 time)
Pro Wrestling Illustrated
PWI ranked him # 205 of the 500 best singles wrestlers of the PWI 500 in 1991

See also
 List of premature professional wrestling deaths

References

External links
The Oklahoma Wrestling Fan's Resource center: Bios - D.J. Peterson
 

1959 births
1993 deaths
20th-century American male actors
American male professional wrestlers
Professional wrestlers from Missouri
Sportspeople from St. Joseph, Missouri
Stampede Wrestling alumni
20th-century professional wrestlers
AWA World Tag Team Champions